The 2021–22 FA Women's Championship was the fourth season of the rebranded FA Women's Championship, the second tier of women's football in England. It was renamed from the FA WSL 2 which was founded in 2014.

On 3 April 2022, Liverpool clinched the league title with a 4–2 win over Bristol City, their 19th consecutive league match unbeaten dating back to a 1–0 defeat at the hands of London City Lionesses on 29 August 2021, the opening game of the season. The result earned Liverpool promotion to the top-flight FA WSL after a two season absence.

On 1 May 2022, the final day of the season, Watford were relegated to the FA Women's National League after only one season in the Championship following a 1–0 defeat at home to relegation rivals Coventry United. Watford started the day two points ahead of Coventry knowing a draw would secure their Championship status. Coventry had not been off the bottom of the table since they were handed a 10 point deduction on 6 January 2022. A 90+7 minute free kick from Mollie Green was the only goal of the game at Vicarage Road as Coventry United finished the season on an eight-game unbeaten streak to remain in the second tier.

Teams

Twelve teams competed in the Championship for the 2021–22 season, an increase of one team from the previous season. This was a planned progression of the restructuring of the English women's game, a move prompted to provide for a fully professional Women's Super League (WSL) starting with the 2018–19 season. The expansion was originally scheduled from the 2019–20 season but the demotion of Yeovil Town directly from the WSL to the third-tier in 2019 and then the season's curtailment the following year as a result of the COVID-19 pandemic had twice delayed this.

Movement between the WSL and Championship was granted on purely sporting merit as both the 2020–21 FA WSL and Championship seasons were completed in full. Leicester City earned promotion and their place was taken by Bristol City who were relegated after finishing bottom of the WSL. London Bees finished bottom of the 2020–21 Championship and were relegated to the National League. Upward movement from the National League was granted via application based on a set criteria including points-per-game over the previous two seasons in order to support the stability and integrity of the women's football pyramid after the previous two National League seasons had both been curtailed due to the COVID-19 pandemic. As a result, Sunderland were promoted from the National League North and Watford were promoted from the National League South.

On 24 December 2021, directors at Coventry United confirmed the club was going into voluntary liquidation. They had accelerated the team into becoming fully-professional prior to the start of the season. With a formal deadline set for 4 January 2022, investor Lewis Taylor made a bid to acquire the club and clear the debts to ensure the club could complete the season. The offer was accepted and the club was rescued although the FA handed down a 10 points deduction for triggering an insolvency event.

Managerial changes

Table

Results

Positions by round
The table lists the positions of teams after each week of matches. In order to preserve chronological progress, any postponed matches are not included in the round at which they were originally scheduled, but added to the full round they were played immediately afterwards. For example, if a match is scheduled for round 13, but then postponed and played between rounds 16 and 17, it will be added to the standings for round 16.

Results by round

Season statistics

Top scorers

Awards

Annual awards

See also
2021–22 FA Women's League Cup
2021–22 FA WSL (tier 1)
2021–22 FA Women's National League (tier 3 & 4)

References

External links
Official website

Women's Championship (England)
2
FA Women's Championship